Matt Wray is a professional rugby league footballer who played in the 2000s.

References

External links
London Broncos 38-14 Wakefield Trinity Wildcats
Wakefield 35-28 Hull

Featherstone Rovers players
Hunslet R.L.F.C. players
Living people
Place of birth missing (living people)
English rugby league players
Rugby league wingers
Wakefield Trinity players
Year of birth missing (living people)